King-Sun Fu (October 2, 1930–April 29, 1985) was a Chinese-born American computer scientist. He was a Goss Distinguished Professor at Purdue University School of Electrical and Computer Engineering in West Lafayette, Indiana. He was instrumental in the founding of International Association for Pattern Recognition (IAPR), served as its first president, and is widely recognized for his extensive and pioneering contributions to the field of pattern recognition (within computer image analysis) and machine intelligence. In honor of the memory of Professor King-Sun Fu, IAPR gives the biennial King-Sun Fu Prize to a living person in the recognition of an outstanding technical contribution to the field of pattern recognition. The first King-Sun Fu Prize was presented in 1988, to Azriel Rosenfeld.

Biography
Fu was born on October 2, 1930, in Nanjing, then China's capital. He received B.S. from National Taiwan University in 1953,  M.A. from University of Toronto in 1955, and Ph.D. from University of Illinois, Urbana-Champaign in 1959.

Fu died on April 29, 1985, in Washington, DC.

Academic life
Fu and others organized the First International Conference Pattern Recognition (ICPR) in 1973 and served as chairman. The conference later evolved into the formation of the International Association for Pattern Recognition by 1976 and was elected to be its president.

He reorganized the Pattern Recognition Committee and was its first chairman in 1974,  which led to the founding of the IEEE Transactions on Pattern Analysis and Machine Intelligence (TPAMI) and he served as its first Editor-in-Chief in 1978.

King-Sun gave invited lectures in China almost every year over the past decades and was a Member of the Academia Sinica in 1978. He was instrumental in establishing the Microelectronics and Information Science and Technology Research Center at the National Chiao Tung University in 1984.

Selected works
 1968. Sequential Methods in Pattern Recognition. Academic
 1970. Sequential Methods in Pattern Recognition and Machine Learning. New York: Academic
 1974. Syntactic Methods in Pattern Recognition. New York: Academic. 
 1980. Statistical Pattern Classification Using Contextual Information.  Wiley
 1982. Syntactic Pattern Recognition and Applications. Prentice-Hall

See also
 Syntactic pattern recognition

References

1930 births
1985 deaths
American computer scientists
Chinese emigrants to the United States
Computer vision researchers
Fellow Members of the IEEE
Members of Academia Sinica
Members of the United States National Academy of Engineering
National Taiwan University alumni
Purdue University faculty
Scientists from Nanjing
Taiwanese people from Jiangsu
University of Illinois Urbana-Champaign alumni
University of Toronto alumni